"Professor" Henry Lewis (1819–1904) was a British-born, self-taught American artist and showman, best known for his paintings of the American West.

Life and career
Lewis was born in Newport, Wales or Scarborough, North Riding of Yorkshire, England, on January 12, 1819, according to Joseph Earl Arrington. John Graham Cooke casts doubt on Lewis's precise birthplace, but mentions Shropshire, England, as a possible birthplace, in that Lewis's father came from there.

Lewis's family immigrated about 1833 to Boston, Massachusetts, where he was apprenticed to a carpenter. At age seventeen, he moved to St. Louis, Missouri, where he worked as a carpenter and scenery painter at the St. Louis Theatre.

Between 1846 and 1848, Lewis sketched and painted hundreds of scenes of the Mississippi River. These included rare views, such as the Mormon Temple at Nauvoo, Illinois (burned 1848), and the great St. Louis Fire of 1849.

Lewis developed his sketches into a giant moving panorama – 12 feet by 1,300 feet – which was unrolled, with music and narration, before theater audiences in the United States and Europe.

Lewis settled in Germany in 1854, and published a book with eighty illustrations based on his panorama: The Illustrated Mississippi: From the Falls of St. Anthony to the Gulf of Mexico (1857). He died in 1904 in Düsseldorf, Germany.

References

External links

Henry Lewis (1819-1904), from AskArt.
John Cushman Abbott Exhibit Supplement—includes a discussion of Lewis and his book Das Illustrirte Mississippithal, a slide show of illustrations from the book, and a downloadable pdf of the book.

1819 births
1904 deaths
19th-century American painters
19th-century American male artists
American male painters
Artists from St. Louis